Pteromonas is a genus of green algae in the family Phacotaceae.

References

External links

Chlamydomonadales genera
Chlamydomonadales